The California Republican Party (CAGOP) is the affiliate of the United States Republican Party in  the U.S. state of California. The party is based in Sacramento and is led by chair Jessica Millan Patterson.

As of October 2020, Republicans represent approximately 24% of the state's registered voters, placing the party far behind the California Democratic Party which has 46% of registered voters. The party is a minority in the California State Legislature, holding only 18 seats out of 80 in the California State Assembly and 8 seats out of 40 in the California State Senate. The party holds none of the eight statewide executive branch offices, 12 of the state's 52 seats in the U.S. House of Representatives delegation, and neither of California's seats in the U.S. Senate.

History 
The Republican Party was born in the 1850s as a primary vehicle to oppose the expansion of slavery in the United States. In 1856, Republicans nominated one of California's inaugural senators, John C. Frémont, for the 1856 presidential election, but he lost the state by a wide margin to Democrat and eventual winner James Buchanan, though he did win the state of New York. Later in 1860, Abraham Lincoln was elected to the presidency as the first Republican president. The Republican Party would emerge as primary opposition to the Democratic Party until the present day. 

California Republicans and Democrats were competitive throughout the late 19th century. In 1878, Republican California Senator Aaron A. Sargent introduced the language that would become the 19th Amendment to the Constitution, which would allow women the right to vote.

Republicans dominated state politics for most of the 20th century (they controlled the state senate from 1891 to 1958) until the 1960s when the Democrats once again became competitive with the rightward shift of the Republican Party, exemplified by their nomination of Barry Goldwater in 1964 (Goldwater lost California in a landslide). Republicans still saw ample success up until the 1990s. George H. W. Bush carried the state in 1988 after Ronald Reagan twice carried the state in 1984 and 1980. Pete Wilson was elected Senator in 1988, and John Seymour was the last Republican Senator from California after being appointed to the seat in 1991. 

California’s Latino and Asian populations grew significantly in the 1990s and the growing segment of voters were turned off by the Republican Party’s hard-line stance on immigration (the Party closely tied itself to Proposition 187). Democrats have won most elections at the state, local, and federal levels since the 2000s by comfortable margins. For example, despite failing to win the presidency, Hillary Clinton won a higher percentage of votes than any candidate since Franklin D. Roosevelt.

Still, California elected Arnold Schwarzenegger twice for governor. Schwarzenegger and Steve Poizner, who later became an independent, are the last Republicans to win statewide elections in California. 

California has two Republican presidents in U.S. history: Richard Nixon, who was a U.S. representative and senator from California, and Ronald Reagan, who was a governor of California (1967–1975). Herbert Hoover also studied in California and lived there for a number of years. Other notable California Republicans include former Governor and Chief Justice Earl Warren, former Governor and Senator Hiram Johnson, and former Senator and founder of Stanford University Leland Stanford.

In 2018, the California Republican Party had fewer registered voters than voters registered with a no party preference option, but that trend reversed in 2020.

Elected officials 
The following is a list of Republican statewide, federal, and legislative officeholders:

Members of Congress

U.S. Senate 
None

Both of California's U.S. Senate seats have been held by Democrats since 1992. John F. Seymour was the last Republican to represent California in the U.S. Senate. Appointed in 1991 by Pete Wilson who resigned his Class I Senate seat because he was elected governor in 1990, Seymour lost the 1992 special election to determine who would serve the remainder of the term expiring in 1995. Seymour lost the special election to Democratic challenger Dianne Feinstein, who was subsequently elected to a full term two years later and has held the seat since. Pete Wilson was also the last Republican elected to represent California in the U.S. Senate in 1988, and the last Republican to represent California for a full term in the U.S. Senate from 1983 to 1989.

With the passage of Prop 14 in 2010 setting up a jungle primary system in California, there was a period of 10 years (2012 – 2022) in which no Republican made the general election for the US Senate, as Republicans were locked out from the general elections in both the 2016 election and the 2018 election.

U.S. House of Representatives 
Out of the 52 seats California is apportioned in the U.S. House of Representatives, 12 are held by Republicans:

CA-01: Doug LaMalfa
CA-03: Kevin Kiley
CA-05: Tom McClintock
CA-13: John Duarte
CA-20: Kevin McCarthy (Speaker of the House)
CA-22: David Valadao
CA-23: Jay Obernolte
CA-27: Mike Garcia
CA-40: Young Kim
CA-41: Ken Calvert
CA-45: Michelle Steel
CA-48: Darrell Issa

Statewide offices 
None

California has not had a statewide Republican officer since January 2011. Republicans were last elected to a statewide office in 2006, when Arnold Schwarzenegger was re-elected as governor and Steve Poizner was elected insurance commissioner. In 2010, term limits prevented Schwarzenegger from seeking a third term while Poizner chose not to seek re-election as insurance commissioner, instead making an unsuccessful bid for the Republican nomination for governor. In 2018, Poizner attempted to run again for his old seat of insurance commissioner, but did so without the affiliation to the Republican Party.

The last Republican to serve as lieutenant governor was Abel Maldonado, who was appointed in 2010 by Schwarzenegger to fill the vacancy when John Garamendi resigned to take a seat in Congress. Maldonado lost his election in 2010 for a full term, and left office in January 2011. The last Republican elected to the position was Mike Curb, who was elected in 1978 and served until January 1983.

The last Republican to serve as Attorney general was Dan Lungren who was elected in 1990, reelected in 1994, and served until January 1999.

The last Republican to serve as Secretary of State was Bruce McPherson who was appointed to the position in 2005 when the previous Secretary of State, Kevin Shelley, resigned. McPherson lost the election for a full term in 2006 and left office in January 2017. The last Republican elected to the position was Bill Jones who was elected in 1994 and reelected in 1998.

The last Republican to serve as State treasurer was Matt Fong who was elected in 1994 and served until January 1999.

The last Republican to serve as State controller was Houston I. Flournoy who was elected in 1966, reelected in 1970, and served until January 1975.

The last Republican to serve as the Superintendent of Public Instruction (which is officially a non-partisan position) is Max Rafferty, who was elected in 1962, reelected in 1966, and served until January 1971.

Board of Equalization, State Senate and Assembly

Board of Equalization 
Republicans hold one of the four non-ex-officio seats on the State Board of Equalization:
1st District: Ted Gaines

State Senate 
Republicans are in the minority, holding eight of the 40 seats in the State Senate. Republicans have been the minority party in the Senate since 1970.

SD-1: Brian Dahle
SD-8: Roger Niello
SD-12: Shannon Grove 
SD-21: Scott Wilk (Minority Leader)
SD-23: Rosilicie Ochoa Bogh
SD-32: Kelly Seyarto
SD-36: Janet Nguyen 
SD-40: Brian Jones

State Assembly 
Republicans hold 18 of the 80 seats in the State Assembly. The last time the Republicans were the majority party in the Assembly was during 1994–1996.

AD-1: Megan Dahle
AD-3: James Gallagher  (Minority Leader)
AD-5: Joe Patterson
AD-7: Josh Hoover
AD-8: Jim PattersonAD-9: Heath FloraAD-22: Juan AlanisAD-32: Vince FongAD-33: Devon Mathis 
AD-34: Tom LackeyAD-47: Greg WallisAD-59: Phillip ChenAD-63: Bill EssayliAD-70: Tri TaAD-71: Kate SanchezAD-72: Diane DixonAD-74: Laurie DaviesAD-75: Marie Waldron Mayoral offices 
Of California's ten largest cities, two have Republican mayors as of July 2022:
Fresno (5): Jerry DyerBakersfield (9): Karen Goh'''

Governance 
The California Republican Party is a "political party that has detailed statutory provisions applicable to its operation", which are in division 7, part 3 of the California Elections Code. The Republican State Central Committee (RSCC), the governing body of the California Republican Party, functions pursuant to its standing rules and bylaws. The RSCC works together with the Republican county central committees and district central committees, with county central committees appointing delegates to the RSCC. The regular officers of the RSCC are the chairman, state vice chairman, eight regional vice chairmen, secretary, and treasurer.

County central committees 
There are semi-autonomous county central committees for each of California's 58 counties. At every direct primary election (presidential primary) or when district boundaries are redrawn, their members are either elected by supervisor district or Assembly district depending on the county.

Party chairs 

 Frank F. Merriam (1928–30)
 Marshal Hale (1930–34)
 Louis B. Mayer (1932–33)
 Earl Warren (1934–36)
 Justus Craemer (1936–38)
 Bradford Melvin (1938–40)
 Thomas Kuchel (1940–42)
 Edward Tickle (1942–44)
 Leo Anderson (1944–46)
 Arthur W. Carlson (1946–48)
 Sim Delapp (1948–50)
 Laughlin Waters (1950–54)
 Thomas W. Caldecott (1954–56)
 Alphonzo E. Bell, Jr. (1956–58)
 George W. Milias (1958–60)
 John Krehbiel (1960–62)
 Caspar Weinberger (1962–64)
 Gaylord Parkinson (1964–67)
 James Halley (1967–69)
 Dennis Carpenter (1969–71)
 Putnam Livermore (1971–73)
 Gordon Luce (1973–75)
 Paul Haerle (1975–77)
 Michael B. Montgomery (1977–79)
 Truman Campbell (1979–81)
 Tirso del Junco (1981–83)
 Ed Reinecke (1983–85)
 Mike Antonovich (1985–87)
 Bob Naylor (1987–89)
 Frank Visco (1989–91)
 Jim Dignan (1991–93)
 Tirso del Junco (1993–95)
 John Herrington (1995–97)
 Michael J. Schroeder (1997–99)
 John McGraw (1999–2001)
 Shawn Steel (2001–03)
 George "Duf" Sundheim (2003–07)
 Ron Nehring (2007–11)
 Tom Del Beccaro (2011–13)
 Jim Brulte (2013–19)
 Jessica Millan Patterson (since 2019)

Election results

Presidential

Gubernatorial

See also 

California State Assembly Republican Caucus
Pasadena Republican Club, the oldest continuously active Republican club in America

References

External links 
California Republican Party
California State Senate Republican Caucus
California State Assembly Republican Caucus
California College Republicans

California
Republican Party